Interdisciplinary Social Science Research Center, also known as Interdisciplinary Center for Social Science (ICSS) is an interdisciplinary research center in Zhejiang University.

History 
ICSS was founded on April 15, 2003, as an important platform, upon which Zhejiang University can make use of its comprehensive advantages in the multi-disciplines to carry out interdisciplinary research.
In October, 2005 it has been listed as a major research orientation in the “Zhejiang University Language and Cognition Research”, the first group National Philosophy and Social Science Innovation Base (II type).

Research Area 
ICSS pursues the moral foundation of market society and explores the innate mechanism for the deepening of the society. Since its foundation, the interdisciplinary center has made remarkable academic achievements.

Staff

Chairman of the academic council for ICSS 
Professor Wang Dingding

Director of ICSS 
Professor Ye Hang

Members of the academic council for ICSS (incomplete) 
Wang Dingding, Herbert Gintis, Samuel Bowles, Shi Jinchuan, Luo Weidong

Location 
7th Floor, Main Teaching Building, Xixi Campus,  Zhejiang University, Hangzhou, China.

External links 
 体育投注客户端 - 官方下载 (Chinese Official Website)

Research Center of Zhejiang University
Research institutes in China